is a railway station in Kawai, Kitakatsuragi, Nara, Japan.

Lines 
 Kintetsu Railway
 Tawaramoto Line

Platform and track

Gallery

External links
 

Railway stations in Japan opened in 1983
Railway stations in Nara Prefecture